The 2022 National Camogie League, known for sponsorship reasons as the Littlewoods Ireland Camogie Leagues, commenced in February 2022.

Format

League structure
The 2022 National Camogie League consisted of four divisions, each divided into several groups:

Division 1 contained 9 teams, divided into one group of 5 and one group of 4
Division 2 contained 13 teams, divided into one group of 5 and two groups of 4
Division 3 contained 9 teams, divided into one group of 5 and one group of 4
Division 4 contained 4 teams, all in one group

Each team played every other team in its group once. 3 points were awarded for a win and 1 for a draw.

If two teams are level on points, the tie-break is:
 winners of the head-to-head game are ranked ahead
 if the head-to-head match was a draw, ranking is determined by the points difference (i.e. total scored minus total conceded in all games)
 if the points difference is equal, ranking is determined by the total scored

If three or more teams are level on league points, rankings are determined solely by points difference.

Finals and relegation 
In Division 1, the group winners meet in the NCL final, while the last-placed team in each group goes into the relegation playoff.

In Division 2, the top two in each group advance to the knockout phase (two group winners get a bye to the semi-finals), with the division champions promoted, while the three last-placed teams play off in a relegation semi-final and final with one team relegated.

In Division 3, the group winners meet in the final, with the division champions promoted, while the last-placed team in each group goes into the relegation playoff.

In Division 4, the top two teams meet in the final, with the division champions promoted.

Fixtures and results

Division 1

Group 1

Group 2

Round-robin results

Finals

References

League
National Camogie League seasons